Club Atlético Independiente has success at the Argentine football level, but they are widely known for their international titles and appearances, being nicknamed Rey de Copas (King of Cups) by the media and his fans. The first international cup they took part was the 1917 Tie Cup, which they lost to Uruguayan team Montevideo Wanderers. In term of international honours, Independiente has won a total of twenty one official titles, with 18 of them organised by CONMEBOL which makes Independiente the most winning team in this category, together with Boca Juniors. Among those international CONMEBOL titles Independiente has a record seven Copa Libertadores, two Intercontinental Cups, two Copa Sudamericana and one Recopa Sudamericana. International titles also include two Copa Aldao, organised by AFA and AUF together.

Independiente is alongside River Plate and Internacional the only teams to win all four of the current CONMEBOL competitions; Libertadores, Sudamericana, Recopa and the Suruga Bank Championship, which they won in 2018.

Although being far behind Boca Juniors and River Plate in terms of popularity, Independiente was voted by the IFFHS as the 2nd best club in South America in the 20th century, and best team in Argentina.

First half of the 20th century 

Independiente began to play friendly games against teams from the neighbouring regions in Uruguay only four years after its foundation. On 25 August 1909, Independiente tied with the now defunct Uruguayan team Bristol in Avellaneda, while still being a lower division team in Argentina. The next friendly international games took place in 1912.

vs.  Bristol, 0−0 (1909); first international match
vs.  Universal, 3−0 (1912); first international trophy
vs.  River Plate, 0−2 (1912); first match outside Argentina

In 1917, Independiente won the national Copa de Competencia Jockey Club, thus earning qualification to the  1917 Tie Cup Final, one of the first official international cups organized between the Argentine Football Association and the Uruguayan Football Association. One year later, the team would qualify again for an international cup.

Independiente would have qualified to the Copa Aldao after winning the 1922 and 1926 Argentine championships (the first ones in its history), but the competition was on hiatus around that years. However, Independiente found participation in other anecdotal football matches.

vs.  Third Lanark, 2−1 (1923); first match against a European team
vs.  Peñarol, 2−2 (1928); inaugural match of Independiente's Estadio Almirante Cordero, the first concrete stadium in South America
vs.  Barcelona, 4−1 (1928); first match against a European champion
vs.  Hakoah All-Stars, 0−0 (1930); first match against a North American team

Both editions in which Independiente took participation at the Copa Aldao resulted in the first official international victories for the red team. In addition to this, Independiente should have participated in a 1948 edition as 1948 Argentine Primera División champions, but it was never done since the Uruguayan Primera División of that year was cancelled.

Rioplatense cups progressively stopped being contested regularly since 1940 after the Copa Aldao of that year was abandoned, so friendly football was, again, the only mean to participate at international stage. The Copa Libertadores was founded in 1960.

vs.  Atlante, 3−3 (1948); first match outside South America
vs.  Real Madrid, 6−0 (1953); first match in Europe

Copa Libertadores 

Independiente is the most successful team in the competition with 7 titles, with 4 of them in a row between 1972 and 1975. A total of 7 finals were played by Independiente, winning all of them. El Rojo was also the first Argentine team to win the competition.

Copa Interamericana 

Independiente is the most successful team in the competition, with 3 titles out of 3 appearances.

A combination of factors such as the lack of financial incentives, large trip costs and lack of proper organizing, led the Copa Interamericana to face irregular scheduling and different formats. For instance, Independiente did not contest the 1973 edition, since the 1973 CONCACAF Champions' Cup was practically abandoned and, in all three editions disputed by the red team, they weren't able to host a match in Argentina when being the "home" team.

Lunar New Year Cup 

Invitation to this HKFA-organized competition was earned by virtue of being the most recent Intercontinental Cup champions.

Supercopa Libertadores 

Independiente is the most successful team in the competition, together with Cruzeiro, due to them being the only ones to win it twice.

With the obtention of those two titles, Independiente qualified to three other official competitions related to the Supercopa; the 1995 Copa Master de Supercopa, the 1995 Copa de Oro and the 1996 Copa de Oro, but Independiente declined participation in all of them.

The 1992 Supercopa Libertadores round of 16 featured the only Avellaneda derby played at international stage; it was won by Racing by a global 2−1.

Copa Mercosur 

This is the only official CONMEBOL competition never won by Independiente among those which the team took participation. The best place reached by the team were the quarterfinals, in 1999 and 2001.

Recopa Sudamericana 

Independiente managed to win only one title out of 4 appearances at this Super Cup competition. All qualifications to the Recopa were achieved as champions of the second-most prestigious competition at the time, either Supercopa or Copa Sudamericana.

The 1995 final with Vélez Sarsfield was, to date, the only game played against a fellow Argentine team in a foreign country.

Copa Sudamericana 

Independiente, Boca Juniors, Athletico Paranaense and Independiente del Valle are the most successful teams, with two titles for each team. In addition to this, Independiente is placed first in the all-time table of the competition.

Suruga Bank Championship 

Independiente leads the competition's all-time table, above Kashima Antlers for a better goal difference.

Intercontinental Cup 

With victories at the 1973 and 1984 editions, Independiente became a two-time club world champion.

In addition to the following results, Independiente qualified to the 1975 edition, but since the 1974–75 European Cup winners refused to take part and the runners-up were banned from international football, it was never played.

With two championships and other four appearances, Independiente is placed second in the competition's all-time table behind Peñarol.

Overall record 

 shared record

Competitive record 
Below is a list of all matches Independiente has played against clubs per country association.

Biggest home wins 
vs.  Nacional, 5−0 (1939 Copa Aldao)
vs.  Deportivo Táchira, 5−0 (1987 Copa Libertadores group stage)

Biggest away win 
vs.  Pepeganga Margarita, 6−0 (1990 Copa Libertadores round of 16)

Biggest two leg win 
vs.  Pepeganga Margarita, 9−0 (1990 Copa Libertadores round of 16)

Biggest home defeat 
vs.  Montevideo Wanderers, 0−4 (1917 Tie Cup)

Biggest away defeats 
vs.  Peñarol, 0−4 (1918 Copa de Honor Cousenier)
vs.  Flamengo, 0−4 (1999 Copa Mercosur quarterfinals)
vs.  Flamengo, 0−4 (2001 Copa Mercosur quarterfinals)
vs.  River Plate, 0−4 (2003 Copa Sudamericana second stage)

Biggest two leg defeat 
vs.  River Plate, 1−8 (2003 Copa Sudamericana second stage)

Longest winning run 
4 matches (1964 Copa Libertadores)
4 matches (1972 Copa Libertadores)

Longest unbeaten run 
13 matches (1984 Copa Libertadores−1985 Copa Libertadores)

Longest winless run 
11 matches (1990 Copa Libertadores−1994 Supercopa Sudamericana)

Longest losing run 
3 matches (1995 Copa Libertadores)
3 matches (2001 Copa Mercosur)

Highest scoring game 
vs.  Universidad de Chile, 6−2 (1998 Copa Mercosur group stage)

Highest home attendances 
vs.  Nacional, 1−0 (1964 Copa Libertadores Finals, 80,000)
vs.  Inter Milan, 0−0 (1965 Intercontinental Cup, 80,000)

Highest away attendance 
vs.  Flamengo, 0−1 (1995 Supercopa Sudamericana Finals, 105,000)

Honours

South America 
Copa Libertadores (7): 1964, 1965, 1972, 1973, 1974, 1975, 1984 (record)
Copa Sudamericana (2): 2010, 2017 (shared record)
Recopa Sudamericana (1): 1995 
Supercopa Sudamericana (2): 1994, 1995 (shared record)
Copa Dr. Ricardo Aldao (2): 1938, 1939

Worldwide 
Intercontinental Cup (2): 1973, 1984  
Copa Interamericana (3): 1972, 1974, 1975 (record)
Suruga Bank Championship (1): 2018 

Notes

Friendly football

International tours

International tours with the majority of its matches taking place outside CONMEBOL associate countries and other invitational competitions involving non-CONMEBOL teams are shown.

Mexico

Central America

Europe

Mexico

United States and Canada

Colombia and Central America

Spain and Italy

Uruguay

Yugoslavia and Spain

Central America

Eurasia

Spain and Venezuela

Mexico

United States and Indonesia

Costa Rica and Guatemala

Haiti

Japan

United States

Spain

United States and Europe

United States

Guatemala and the United States

Mexico

Japan

United States and Canada

Mexico and the United States

Honours

Trofeo Asociación Anglo-Argentine: 1912
Torneo Internacional Nocturno: 1936
Copa Confraternidad: 1939
Trofeo Universidad de Chile: 1940
Copa Fraternidad: 1941
Copa Intendente Municipal: 1941
Copa Ministerio de Hacienda: 1941
Copa Presidente M. Prado: 1941
Copa Fajer: 1948
Torneio Cuadrangular de Lisboa: 1953
Torneo Cuadrangular de Buenos Aires: 1955
Torneo Internacional de Chile: 1964
Consular Cup: 1965
Trofeo Festa d'Elx: 1967
Trofeo Internacional Montilla Moriles: 1967
Trofeo IPSP: 1973
Souvenir Program 50c Trophy: 1975
Torneo Pentagonal de Cochabamba: 1975
Copa de Oro (Mar del Plata) (2): 1980, 1981
Trofeo Villa de Madrid: 1981
Torneo Internacional de Miami: 1986
Copa de las Instituciones: 1993
Copa Carlos S. Menem: 1994
Copa de Invierno: 1997
Copa Cerveza Cristal: 2003
Copa Alberto Zozaya: 2009
Copa Ciudad de Pelotas: 2012

See also
 List of CONMEBOL club competition winners
 List of Copa Libertadores finals
 List of world champion football clubs

References

i
i